The Pleasant Grove Camp Meeting Ground is a historic Methodist camp meeting national historic district located near Waxhaw, Union County, North Carolina.  The district encompasses four contributing buildings and one contributing site.  The main building is the arbor that dates to 1830.  It is an 80 feet long by 60 feet wide open sided frame structure with a gable roof surround on all four sides by pent roof extensions.  Located nearby are the church and former schoolhouse, now used as the preacher's dwelling, and the old cemetery.

It was listed on the National Register of Historic Places in 1973.

See also 

Balls Creek Campground
Ocean Grove Camp Meeting Association
Center Arbor
Chapel Hill Church Tabernacle

References

External links 
Pleasant Grove Campground
Pleasant Grove United Methodist Church

Properties of religious function on the National Register of Historic Places in North Carolina
Historic districts on the National Register of Historic Places in North Carolina
Geography of Union County, North Carolina
Buildings and structures in Union County, North Carolina
National Register of Historic Places in Union County, North Carolina
Camp meeting grounds
Methodism in North Carolina
Campgrounds in North Carolina